Liroy Zhairi (born 2 March 1989) is an Israeli football midfielder. He currently plays for Maccabi Herzliya.

External links

1989 births
Living people
Israeli Jews
Israeli footballers
Footballers from Central District (Israel)
Bnei Yehuda Tel Aviv F.C. players
K.V. Mechelen players
Maccabi Haifa F.C. players
Hapoel Petah Tikva F.C. players
Beitar Jerusalem F.C. players
Maccabi Petah Tikva F.C. players
Hapoel Ironi Kiryat Shmona F.C. players
Hapoel Kfar Saba F.C. players
Maccabi Herzliya F.C. players
Belgian Pro League players
Israeli Premier League players
Israeli people of Yemeni-Jewish descent
Israeli expatriate footballers
Expatriate footballers in Belgium
Israeli expatriate sportspeople in Belgium
People from Magshimim
Association football midfielders